Sarhaniyeh-ye Sofla (also Romanized as Sarḩānīyeh-ye Soflá) is a village in Howmeh-ye Gharbi Rural District, in the Central District of Khorramshahr County, Khuzestan Province, Iran. At the 2006 census, its population was 1,191, in 251 families.

References 

Populated places in Khorramshahr County